675 (The Rifles) Squadron AAC is an Army Reserve helicopter support squadron of the British Army Air Corps that provides groundcrews to support Wildcat helicopters. The squadron is part of 6 Regiment Army Air Corps (6 Regt AAC) and is located in Somerset at Taunton and Yeovil.

The Squadron was established on 1 April 2014 having previously been B Company, 6th Battalion, The Rifles, an Army Reserve infantry regiment, previously part of The Light Infantry.

Paired with 1 Regiment Army Air Corps (1 Regt AAC) at RNAS Yeovilton, the Squadron provides ground support, Communications specialists, logisticians, medics, chefs and administration staff to the Army's new AgustaWestland Wildcat helicopter Regt, 1 Reg AAC based at Yeovilton. It also has scope to support the Army's AgustaWestland Apache attack helicopter.  All soldiers in the Squadron are trained in rigging and dealing with underslung loads which can be carried by a variety of aircraft including both AgustaWestland Merlin and Boeing Chinook.

The flight currently based at the Army Reserve Centre in Bishops Hull, Taunton also has a Flight based in the newly refurbished Army Reserve Centre in Yeovil  in the county of Somerset.

See also

 List of Army Air Corps aircraft units

References

Army Air Corps aircraft squadrons
Military units and formations established in 2014